Robert Michael Mapplethorpe (November 4, 1946 – March 9, 1989) was an American photographer, best known for his black-and-white photographs. His work featured an array of subjects, including celebrity portraits, male and female nudes, self-portraits, and still-life images. His most controversial works documented and examined the gay male BDSM subculture of New York City in the late 1960s and early 1970s. A 1989 exhibition of Mapplethorpe's work, titled Robert Mapplethorpe: The Perfect Moment, sparked a debate in the United States concerning both use of public funds for "obscene" artwork and the Constitutional limits of free speech in the United States.

Biography 
Mapplethorpe was born in the Floral Park neighborhood of Queens, New York, the son of Joan Dorothy (Maxey) and Harry Irving Mapplethorpe, an electrical engineer. He was of English, Irish, and German descent, and grew up as a Catholic in Our Lady of the Snows Parish. Mapplethorpe attended Martin Van Buren High School, graduating in 1963. He had three brothers and two sisters. One of his brothers, Edward, later worked for him as an assistant and became a photographer as well. He studied for a Bachelor of Fine Arts from the Pratt Institute in Brooklyn, where he majored in Graphic Arts, though he dropped out in 1969 before finishing his degree.
 
Mapplethorpe lived with his girlfriend Patti Smith from 1967 to 1972, and she supported him by working in bookstores. They created art together, and maintained a close friendship throughout Mapplethorpe's life.
 

 
Mapplethorpe took his first photographs in the late 1960s or early 1970s using a Polaroid camera. He also designed and sold his own jewelry, which was worn by Warhol superstar Joe Dallesandro.
 
In 1972, Mapplethorpe met art curator Sam Wagstaff, who would become his mentor, lover, patron, and lifetime companion. In the mid-1970s, Wagstaff acquired a Hasselblad medium-format camera and Mapplethorpe began taking photographs of a wide circle of friends and acquaintances, including artists, composers, and socialites. During this time, he became friends with New Orleans artist George Dureau, whose work had such a profound impact on Mapplethorpe that he restaged many of Dureau's early photographs. From 1977 until 1980, Mapplethorpe was the lover of writer and Drummer editor Jack Fritscher, who introduced him to the Mineshaft (a members-only BDSM gay leather bar and sex club in Manhattan). Mapplethorpe took many pictures of the Mineshaft and was at one point its official photographer (... "After dinner I go to the Mineshaft.")
 
By the 1980s, Mapplethorpe's subject matter focused on statuesque male and female nudes, delicate flower still lifes, and highly formal portraits of artists and celebrities. Mapplethorpe's first studio was at 24 Bond Street in Manhattan. In the 1980s, Wagstaff bought a top-floor loft at 35 West 23rd Street for Robert, where he resided, also using it as a photo-shoot studio. He kept the Bond Street loft as his darkroom. In 1988, Mapplethorpe selected Patricia Morrisroe to write his biography, which was based on more than 300 interviews with celebrities, critics, lovers, and Mapplethorpe himself.
 
Mapplethorpe died at the age of 42 due to complications from HIV/AIDS in a Boston hospital on March 9, 1989. His body was cremated. His ashes are interred at St. John's Cemetery, Queens in New York City, at his mother's grave-site, etched "Maxey".

Robert Mapplethorpe Foundation 
Nearly a year before his death, the ailing Mapplethorpe helped found the Robert Mapplethorpe Foundation, Inc. His vision for the Foundation was that it would be "the appropriate vehicle to protect his work, to advance his creative vision, and to promote the causes he cared about". Since his death, the Foundation has not only functioned as his official estate and helped promote his work throughout the world, but has also raised and donated millions of dollars to fund medical research in the fight against AIDS and HIV infection. In 1991 the Foundation received the Large Nonprofit Organization of the Year award as part of the Pantheon of Leather Awards. The Foundation donated $1 million towards the 1993 establishment of the Robert Mapplethorpe Residence, a six-story townhouse for long-term residential AIDS treatment on East 17th Street in New York City, in partnership with Beth Israel Medical Center. The residence closed in 2015 citing financial difficulties. The Foundation also promotes fine art photography at the institutional level. The Foundation helps determine which galleries represent Mapplethorpe's art. In 2011, the Robert Mapplethorpe Foundation donated the Robert Mapplethorpe Archive, spanning from 1970 to 1989, to the Getty Research Institute.

Art 

Mapplethorpe worked primarily in a studio, and almost exclusively in black and white, with the exception of some of his later work and his final exhibit "New Colors". His body of work features a wide range of subjects and the greater part of his work is on erotic imagery. He would refer to some of his own work as pornographic, with the aim of arousing the viewer, but which could also be regarded as high art. His erotic art explored a wide range of sexual subjects, depicting the BDSM subculture of New York in the 1970s, portrayals of black male nudes, and classical nudes of female bodybuilders. One of the black models he worked with regularly was Derrick Cross, whose pose for the self-titled image in 1983 has been compared to the Farnese Hercules. Mapplethorpe was a participant observer for much of his erotic photography, participating in the sexual acts which he was photographing and engaging his models sexually.
 
Other subjects included flowers, especially orchids and calla lilies, children, statues, and celebrities and other artists, including Andy Warhol, Louise Bourgeois, Deborah Harry, Kathy Acker, Richard Gere, Peter Gabriel, Grace Jones, Amanda Lear, Laurie Anderson, Iggy Pop, Philip Glass, David Hockney, Cindy Sherman, Joan Armatrading, and Patti Smith. Smith was a longtime roommate of Mapplethorpe and a frequent subject in his photography, including a stark, iconic photograph that appears on the cover of Smith's first album, Horses. His work often made reference to religious or classical imagery, such as a 1975 portrait of Patti Smith from 1986 which recalls Albrecht Dürer's 1500 self-portrait. Between 1980 and 1983, Mapplethorpe created over 150 photographs of bodybuilder Lisa Lyon, culminating in the 1983 photobook Lady, Lisa Lyon, published by Viking Press and with text by Bruce Chatwin.

Controversy

The Perfect Moment (1989 solo exhibit tour) 
In the summer of 1989, a traveling solo exhibit by Mapplethorpe brought national attention to the issues of public funding for the arts, as well as questions of censorship and the obscene. The Corcoran Gallery of Art in Washington, D.C., had agreed to be one of the host museums for the tour. Mapplethorpe decided to show his latest series that he explored shortly before his death. Titled Robert Mapplethorpe: The Perfect Moment, the show included photographs from his X Portfolio, which featured images of urophagia, gay BDSM and a self-portrait with a bullwhip inserted in his anus. It also featured photos of two children with exposed genitals. The show was curated by Janet Kardon of the Institute of Contemporary Art (ICA). The ICA was awarded a grant from the National Endowment for the Arts to support Mapplethorpe's exhibit at the Corcoran Gallery of Art. The Corcoran cancelled the show, terminating its contract with the ICA, because it did not want to get involved in the political issues that it raised, but instead the gallery was pulled into the controversy, which "intensified the debate waged both in the media and in Congress surrounding the NEA's funding of projects perceived by some individuals...to be inappropriate." The hierarchy of the Corcoran and several members of the United States Congress were upset when the works were revealed to them, due to the homoerotic and sadomasochistic themes of some of the work. Though much of his work throughout his career had been regularly displayed in publicly funded exhibitions, conservative and religious organizations such as the American Family Association seized on this exhibition to vocally oppose government support for what they called "nothing more than the sensational presentation of potentially obscene material."
 
In June 1989, pop artist Lowell Blair Nesbitt became involved in the censorship issue. Nesbitt, a long-time friend of Mapplethorpe, revealed that he had a $1.5-million bequest to the museum in his will, but publicly promised that if the museum refused to host the exhibition, he would revoke the bequest. The Corcoran refused and Nesbitt bequeathed the money to the Phillips Collection instead. After the Corcoran refused the Mapplethorpe exhibition, the underwriters of the exhibition went to the nonprofit Washington Project for the Arts, which showed all the images in its space from July 21 to August 13, 1989, to large crowds. In 1990, the Contemporary Arts Center in Cincinnati, which had also shown the exhibit, and Dennis Barrie, were charged with obscenity; photographs that depicted men in sadomasochistic poses were the basis of charges that the museum and its director had pandered obscenity. They were found not guilty by a jury.
 
According to the ICA, "The Corcoran's decision sparked a controversial national debate: Should tax dollars support the arts? Who decides what is 'obscene' or 'offensive' in public exhibitions? And if art can be considered a form of free speech, is it a violation of the First Amendment to revoke federal funding on grounds of obscenity? To this day, these questions remain very much at issue." Mapplethorpe became something of a cause célèbre for both sides of the American culture war. However, prices for many of the Mapplethorpe photographs doubled and even tripled as a consequence of all the attention. The artist's notoriety supposedly also helped the posthumous sale at Christie's auction house of Mapplethorpe's own collection of furniture, pottery, silver and works by other artists, which brought about $8 million.

University of Central England incident 
In 1998, the University of Central England was involved in a controversy when a library book by Mapplethorpe was confiscated. A final-year undergraduate student was writing a paper on the work of Mapplethorpe and intended to illustrate the paper with a few photographs made from Mapplethorpe, a book of the photographer's work. She took the film to a local shop to be developed and the staff there informed West Midlands Police because of the unusual nature of the images. The police confiscated the library book from the student and informed the university that two photographs in the book would have to be removed. If the university agreed to the removal (which it did not) the book would be returned. The two photographs, which were deemed possibly prosecutable as obscenity, were "Helmut and Brooks, NYC, 1978", which shows anal fisting, and "Jim and Tom, Sausalito, 1977", which is of a man clad in a dog collar, a leather mask and trousers, urinating into another man's mouth." After a delay of about six months, the affair came to an end when Peter Knight, the Vice-Chancellor of the university, was informed that no legal action would be taken. The book was returned to the university library without removal of the photographs.

The Black Book 
The 1986 solo exhibition "Black Males" and the subsequent book The Black Book sparked controversy for their depiction of black men. The images, erotic depictions of black men, were widely criticized for being exploitative. The work was largely phallocentric and sculptural, focusing on segments of the subject's bodies. His purported intention with these photographs and the use of black men as models was the pursuit of the Platonic ideal. Mapplethorpe's initial interest in the black male form was inspired by films like Mandingo and the interrogation scene in Cruising, in which an unknown black character enters the interrogation room and slaps the protagonist across the face.
 
Criticism was the subject of a work by American conceptual artist Glenn Ligon, Notes on the Margins of the Black Book (1991–1993). Ligon juxtaposes Mapplethorpe's 91 images of black men in the 1988 publication Black Book with critical texts and personal reactions about the work to complicate the racial undertones of the imagery.
 
American poet and activist Essex Hemphill also expressed criticism in his anthology Brother to Brother (1991). Although he believed that Mapplethorpe's work reflected exceptional talent, Hemphill also believed that it displayed a lack of concern for gay black men, "except as sexual subjects".

Posthumously 
In 1992, author Paul Russell dedicated his novel Boys of Life to Mapplethorpe, as well as to Karl Keller and Pier Paolo Pasolini.
 
When Mapplethorpe: A Biography by Patricia Morrisroe was published by Random House in 1995, the Washington Post Book World described it as "Mesmerizing ... Morrisroe has succeeded in re-creating the photographer's world of light and dark." Art critic Arthur C. Danto, writing in The Nation, praised it as "utterly admirable ... The clarity and honesty of Morrisroe's portrait are worthy of its subject."
 
In 1996, Patti Smith wrote a book The Coral Sea dedicated to Mapplethorpe.
 
In September 1999, Arena Editions published Pictures, a monograph that reintroduced Mapplethorpe's sex pictures. In 2000, Pictures was seized by two South Australian plain-clothes detectives from an Adelaide bookshop in the belief that the book breached indecency and obscenity laws. Police sent the book to the Canberra-based Office of Film and Literature Classification after the state Attorney-General's Department deftly decided not to get involved in the mounting publicity storm. Eventually, the OFLC board agreed unanimously that the book, imported from the United States, should remain freely available and unrestricted.
 
In May 2007, American writer, director, and producer James Crump directed the documentary film Black White + Gray, which premiered at the 2007 Tribeca Film Festival. It explores the influence Mapplethorpe, curator Sam Wagstaff, and Patti Smith had on the 1970s art scene in New York City.
 
In September 2007, Prestel published Mapplethorpe: Polaroids, a collection of 183 of approximately 1,500 existing Mapplethorpe polaroids. This book accompanies an exhibition by the Whitney Museum of American Art in May 2008.
 
In 2008, Robert Mapplethorpe was named by Equality Forum as one of their 31 Icons of the 2015 LGBT History Month.
 
Patti Smith's 2010 memoir Just Kids focuses on her relationship with Mapplethorpe. The book won the 2010 National Book Award for Nonfiction.
 
In June 2016, Belgian fashion designer Raf Simons debuted his men's Spring 2017 collection inspired by Mapplethorpe's work and featuring several of his photographs printed onto shirts, jackets, and smocks.
 
The American documentary film, Mapplethorpe: Look at the Pictures, was released in 2016. It was directed and executive produced by Randy Barbato and Fenton Bailey, and produced by Katharina Otto-Bernstein.
 
In January 2016, filmmaker Ondi Timoner announced that she was directing a feature about him, Mapplethorpe, with Matt Smith in the lead role. The film premiered on April 22, 2018, at the Tribeca Film Festival in New York City.
 
In 2019 and 2020, the Guggenheim Museum in New York City hosted Implicit Tensions, an exhibition of many of Mapplethorpe's works.
 
In collaboration with the Mapplethorpe Foundation, jeweler Gaia Repossi created a jewelry collection inspired by Mapplethorpe in 2021.

Art market 
In 2017, a 1987 Mapplethorpe self-portrait platinum print was auctioned for £450,000, making it the most expensive Mapplethorpe photograph ever sold.

Selected publications

Selected exhibitions 

 
1973: Polaroids, Light Gallery, New York.

 1977:
Flowers, Holly Solomon Gallery, New York.
Erotic Pictures, The Kitchen, New York.
Portraits, Holly Solomon Gallery, New York.
 1978:
 The Chrysler Museum, Norfolk, VA. Catalogue with text by Mario Amaya.
 Los Angeles Institute of Contemporary Art, Los Angeles, CA.
 1983
 Lady, Lisa Lyon, Leo Castelli Gallery, New York
 Robert Mapplethorpe, Centre National d'Art et de Culture Georges Pompidou, Paris.
 Robert Mapplethorpe, 1970–1983, Institute of Contemporary Arts, London. Traveled to Stills, Edinburgh; Arnolfini, Bristol; Midland Group, Nottingham; and Museum of Modern Art, Oxford. Catalogue with text by Stuart Morgan and Alan Hollinghurst.
 Robert Mapplethorpe, Fotografie, Centro di Documentazione di Palazzo Fortuny, Venice. Traveled to Palazzo Delle Cento Finestre, Florence (1984). Catalogue with text by Germano Celant.
 1987:
 Robert Mapplethorpe 1986, Raab Galerie, Berlin; Kicken-Pauseback Galerie, Cologne. Catalogue with interview by Anne Horton.
 Robert Mapplethorpe, Obalne galerije, Piran, Ljubljana, Yugoslavia. Catalogue with text by Germano Celant.
 1988:
 Whitney Museum of American Art, New York
 Robert Mapplethorpe, the Perfect Moment, Institute of Contemporary Art, Philadelphia; Traveled to Museum of Contemporary Art, Chicago; Washington Project for the Arts, Washington, D.C.; Wadsworth Atheneum, Hartford, Connecticut; University Art Museum, University of California, Berkeley; Contemporary Arts Center, Cincinnati, Ohio; and Institute of Contemporary Art, Boston. Catalogue with text by Janet Kardon, David Joselit, Kay Larson, and Patti Smith.
 1992:
 Robert Mapplethorpe, Louisiana Museum of Modern Art, Humlebaek, Denmark; Castello di Rivoli Museo d'Arte Contemporanea, Turin, Italy (1992); Moderna Museet, Stockholm (1992); Museo d'Arte Contemporanea, Prato, Italy (1993); Residence of Ambassador Negroponte, Manila, Philippines (1993); Museo Pecci Prato, Prato, Italy (1993); Turun Taidemuseo, Turku, Finland (1993); Palais des Beaux Arts, Brussels (1993); Tel Aviv Museum of Art, Tel Aviv (1994); Fundació Joan Miró, Barcelona (1994); KunstHaus, Wien, Vienna (1994); Museum of Contemporary Art, Sydney (1995); Art Gallery of Western Australia, Perth (1995); City Gallery Wellington, Wellington, New Zealand (1995); Hayward Gallery, London (1996); Gallery of Photography, Dublin (1996); Museo de Art Moderna, São Paulo(1997); Staatdgalerie, Stuttgart (1997). Catalogue with text by Germano Celant.
 Robert Mapplethorpe, Tokyo Teien Museum, Tokyo. Curated by Toshio Shimizu. Traveled to ATM Contemporary Art Gallery, Mito, Japan; The Museum of Modern Art, Kamakura, Japan; Nagoya City Art Museum, Nagoya, Japan; The Museum of Modern Art, Shiga, Japan.
 1996:
 Les Autoportraits de Mapplethorpe, Galerie Baudoin Lebon, Paris.
 1997: Robert Mapplethorpe, Mitsukoshi Museum of Art, Shinjuku, Japan. Curated by Richard D. Marshall, Noriko Fuku, and Hiroaki Hayakawa. Traveled to Takashimaya "Grand Hall", Osaka; Fukushima Prefectural Museum of Art, Fukishima; Hokkaido Asahikawa Museum of Art, Asahikawa; Sogo Museum of Art, Yokohama; Marugame Genichiro-Inokuma Museum of Contemporary Art, Kagawa.
 1999: Robert Mapplethorpe, Centre Cultural La Beneficencia, Valencia, Spain.
 2002: Robert Mapplethorpe Retrospective, Museum of Contemporary Art, Sapporo, Japan. Curated by Toshio Shimizu.
 2003: Eye to Eye, Sean Kelly Gallery, New York. Curated by Cindy Sherman.
 2004: Pictures, Pictures, Marc Selwyn Fine Art, Los Angeles. Curated by Catherine Opie.
 2005:
 Robert Mapplethorpe and the Classical Tradition: Photographs and Mannerist Prints, Solomon R. Guggenheim Museum, New York. Traveled to Deutsche Guggenheim Museum, Berlin; The State Hermitage Museum, St. Petersburg (2005); Moscow House of Photography, Moscow (2005); The Guggenheim Hermitage Museum, Las Vegas (2006–2007).
 Robert Mapplethorpe, Alison Jacques Gallery, London. Curated by David Hockney.
 Robert Mapplethorpe, Galeria Fortes Vilaca, São Paulo. Curated by Vik Muniz.
 Robert Mapplethorpe: Tra Antico e Moderno. Un'antologia, Palazzina della Promotrice delle Belle Arti, Turin, Italy. Curated by Germano Celant.
 2006: Robert Mapplethorpe, Galerie Thaddaeus Ropac, Salzburg. Curated by Robert Wilson.
 2008: Mapplethorpe: Polaroids, Whitney Museum of American Art, New York. Traveled to: Mary & Leigh Block Museum of Art, Chicago (2009); Henry Art Gallery, Seattle (2009).
 2009:
 Sterling Ruby & Robert Mapplethorpe, Xavier Hufkens Gallery, Brussels.
 Robert Mapplethorpe: Perfection in Form, Galleria dell'Accademia, Florence. Traveled to: Museo de Arte, Lugano (2010).
 Artist Rooms Tour: Robert Mapplethorpe, Organized by the Tate/ National Galleries of Scotland/Art Fund, Inverness Museum and Art Gallery, Inverness-shire, UK. 2009. Traveled to: Museums Sheffield, Sheffield, UK (2009); Towner Art Gallery, Eastbourne, UK (2010).
 2010: Robert Mapplethorpe, NRW-Forum Kultur Wirtschaft, Düsseldorf. Traveled to: C/O Berlin, Berlin (2011); Fotografiska, Stockholm (2011); Forma Foundation for Photography, Milan (2011); Ludwig Museum, Budapest (2012).
 2011:
 Robert Mapplethorpe curated by Pedro Almodóvar, Galeria Elvira Gonzalez, Madrid.
 Robert Mapplethorpe: Curated by Sofia Coppola, Galerie Thaddaeus Ropac, Paris.
 Robert Mapplethorpe, Onassis Cultural Centre, Athens, Greece.
 2012:
 Artist Rooms Scottish Tour: Robert Mapplethorpe, Dunoon Burgh Hall, Dunoon, UK. Traveled to: The Gallery at Linlithgow Burgh Halls, Linlithgow, UK, Perth Museum & Art Gallery, Perth, UK (2012), Old Gala House, Galashiels, UK (2013).
 Robert Mapplethorpe: XYZ, Los Angeles County Museum of Art, Los Angeles.
 In Focus: Robert Mapplethorpe, J. Paul Getty Museum at the Getty Center, Los Angeles.
 2014:
 Robert Mapplethorpe, Grand Palais, Paris. Traveled to: Kiasma Museum of Contemporary Art, Helsinki (2015).
 Robert Mapplethorpe: Photographs from the Kinsey Institute Collection, Kinsey Institute, Bloomington, Indiana.
 2015: Warhol & Mapplethorpe: Guise & Dolls, Wadsworth Atheneum Museum of Art, Hartford.
 2016:
 Mapplethorpe + Munch, The Munch Museum, Oslo.
 Robert Mapplethorpe: The Perfect Medium, Los Angeles County Museum of Art and the J. Paul Getty Museum, Los Angeles. Traveled to: The Montreal Museum of Fine Arts, Montreal, Kunsthal Rotterdam, Rotterdam, Art Gallery of New South Wales, Sydney (2017).
 Robert Mapplethorpe: On the Edge, ARoS Aarhus Art Museum, Aarhus, Denmark.
 Teller on Mapplethorpe, Alison Jacques Gallery, London.
 2017:
 Robert Mapplethorpe, Xavier Hufkens, Brussels.
 Robert Mapplethorpe, a perfectionist, Kunsthal, Rotterdam, Holland.
 Memento Mori: Robert Mapplethorpe Photographs from the Peter Marino Collection, Chanel Nexus Hall, Tokyo. Traveled to: Kyotographie 2017, Kyoto.
 Dangerous Art: Queer Show. Haifa Museum of Art. Curated by Svetlana Reingold.
 2018:
 Robert Mapplethorpe, Gladstone Gallery, New York. Curated by Roe Ethridge.
 Robert Mapplethorpe: Pictures, Serralves Foundation, Porto, Portugal.
 Robert Mapplethorpe. Coreografia per una mostra / Choreography for an Exhibition, Madre museum, Naples, Italy. Curated by Laura Valente and Andrea Viliani.
 2019:
 Implicit Tensions: Mapplethorpe Now, Solomon R. Guggenheim Museum in New York City. January 25 – July 10, 2019 and July 24, 2019 – January 5, 2020

See also 
 Dirty Pictures
 LGBT culture in New York City
 List of LGBT people from New York City
 Andres Serrano
 Cynthia Slater
 Tamotsu Yatō

References

Further reading 
 Marshall, Richard, Richard Howard, and Ingrid Sischy. Robert Mapplethorpe. New York: Whitney Museum of American Art in association with New York Graphic Society Books, 1988. 
 Veith, Gene Edward. State of the arts: from Bezalel to Mapplethorpe. Wheaton, IL: Crossway Books, 1991. 
 Ellenzweig, Allen. The homoerotic photograph: male images from Durieu/Delacroix to Mapplethorpe. New York: Columbia University Press, 1992. 
 Fritscher, Jack. Mapplethorpe: Assault with a Deadly Camera: A Pop Culture Memoir, An Outlaw Reminiscence. Mamaroneck, NY: Hastings House, 1994. 
 Fritscher, Jack. "What Happened When: Censorship, Gay History & Mapplethorpe", in Censorship: A World Encyclopedia, ed. Derek Jones, Fitzroy Dearborn, 2001, . Retrieved 2014-09-02
 Jarzombek, Mark. "The Mapplethorpe trial and the paradox of its formalist and liberal defense: sights of contention." AppendX 2:58–81, Spring 1994.
 Morrisroe, Patricia. Robert Mapplethorpe: a biography. New York: Random House, 1995. 
 Danto, Arthur C. Playing with the edge: the photographic achievement of Robert Mapplethorpe. Berkeley: University of California Press, 1996. 
 Banham, Gary. "Mapplethorpe, Duchamp and the ends of photography". Angelaki 7(1):119–128, 2002.
 Smith, Patti. Just Kids. New York: Ecco, 2010. 
 Curley, Mallory. A Cookie Mueller Encyclopedia. Randy Press, 2010.
 Gefter, Philip. Wagstaff: Before and After Mapplethorpe. NY: Liveright, 2014.

External links 

 Exhibit at the Xavier Hufkens gallery
 26 Photos: Mapplethorpe, Photography and Sculpture
 Encyclopædia Britannica
 
 
 

1946 births
1989 deaths
20th-century American photographers
20th-century Roman Catholics
AIDS-related deaths in Massachusetts
Album-cover and concert-poster artists
American erotic photographers
American people of English descent
American people of Irish descent
American portrait photographers
Artists from New York City
BDSM photographers
Bondage artists
Burials at St. John's Cemetery (Queens)
Catholics from New York (state)
Censorship in the arts
Fetish photographers
American gay artists
LGBT people from New York (state)
American LGBT photographers
LGBT Roman Catholics
Nude photography
Obscenity controversies in photography
People from Queens, New York
People from the Flatiron District, Manhattan
Photographers from New York (state)
Pratt Institute alumni
20th-century American LGBT people